IIMC may refer to:
Indian Institute of Management Calcutta
Indian Institute of Mass Communication, New Delhi
Institute for Indian Mother and Child, Calcutta
Inadvertent Entry Into Instrument Meteorological Conditions, an unplanned entry into Instrument meteorological conditions